Organizacja Bojowa means military organization in Polish. In particular, the term may refer to:

Antyfaszystowska Organizacja Bojowa
Organizacja Bojowa PPS
Socjalistyczna Organizacja Bojowa
Żydowska Organizacja Bojowa